The 6N24P (Russian: 6Н24П) is a miniature Russian-made medium gain dual, frame grid triode vacuum tube, intended for service as a cascode amplifier at HF through VHF frequencies. The construction of the tube is asymmetrical, with the control grid of the first triode section (pin no. 2) being internally connected to the internal RF shielding plate, thereby making the first section more suitable for common grid operation.
It is a direct equivalent of ECC89 and 6FC7 vacuum tubes.

Basic data 

Uf = 6.3V, If = 300 mA uM = 33 Ia = 15 mA S = 12.5 mA/V Pa = 1.8 W

See also 
6N14P
6DJ8

External links 
6N24P tube datasheet
ECC89 at the National Valve Museum

Vacuum tubes